Experimenter can mean:

 An experimentalist, a researcher whose primary focus is on experiments
 Experimenter (film), a 2015 film about Stanley Milgram's infamous experiments on the response to authority
 Experimenter Publishing, an American media company founded by Hugo Gernsback